Arthur Davis ( Davidavitch) (June 14, 1905 – May 9, 2000) was an American animator and director known for his time at Warner Brothers' Termite Terrace cartoon studio.

Early life 
Davis was born on June 14, 1905, in Yonkers, New York to Hungarian parents. He is the younger brother of animator Mannie Davis.

Career 
Davis got his start as a teenager at Raoul Barre's Studio in 1918 and later moved to Jefferson Film Corporation when the Mutt and Jeff cartoons began being made there in January 1921 it was claimed that he won a cartoon competition. In 1923 he joined Out Of The Inkwell Films in New York, working as an assistant in 1922 since Dick Huemer proposed him to be an assistant. He is reputed to have been the first in-betweener in the animation industry. Another of his distinctions was that he tapped out the famous "bouncing ball" of the "Follow the Bouncing Ball" cartoons of the 1920s. While one of the Fleischer brothers played the ukulele, Davis would keep time with a wooden stick with a white cut-out circle on the end, which was photographed and incorporated into the films as the actual moving ball. Later he was an assistant animator (soon promoted to an actual animator) for the Charles Mintz studio beginning in 1930. While there, he helped create and develop Toby the Pup and Scrappy with fellow animators Dick Huemer and Sid Marcus. Davis would eventually be promoted to director and remained at the studio even when Mintz died in 1939.

In 1941, Davis was fired from Screen Gems by Frank Tashlin and moved to Leon Schlesinger Productions (which would be renamed Warner Bros. Cartoons once Schlesinger sold his studio to Warner Bros.). Davis worked as an animator for Tashlin's department until late 1944 when it was assumed by Robert McKimson. Later in May 1945, when Bob Clampett left to start his own studio, Davis took over Clampett's unit. Davis finished a few of Clampett's planned cartoons, including "The Goofy Gophers" and "Bacall to Arms".

Davis directed a number of Looney Tunes and Merrie Melodies shorts, with a tone somewhere between those of Clampett and McKimson. He had a distinctive characteristic visual style, which can be seen as far back as Davis' Columbia shorts, in which the characters move from the foreground to the background, as well as from side to side, using all axes of the animation field. His department was shut down only two years later in 1947 when Warners was having a budget problem. Davis was then taken into Friz Freleng's unit, and served as one of Freleng's key animators for many years. In 1960, shortly prior to departing the studio, Davis directed a cartoon for Warners again using Freleng's unit (there were several shorts released around this time, from not only Freleng's unit but Chuck Jones' as well, where the direction was credited to varying subordinates). "Quackodile Tears", which would not see release until 1962 due to the studio's elongated release backlog, was also Davis's last Warner Brothers short.

Following his departure from Warners, Davis joined Hanna-Barbera, where he worked briefly as an animator and was a story director for The Flintstones and The Yogi Bear Show. He continued to work on and off with the studio as a consultant or a timing director until his retirement.

After leaving the studio in 1962, Davis went to Walter Lantz Productions as an animator. He left Lantz in 1965 he then later joining DePatie-Freleng Enterprises to direct Pink Panther shorts and other cartoon series.

Outliving most of his peers, Davis died peacefully on May 9, 2000, aged 94 in Sunnyvale, California after humming a tune. He was cremated and his ashes were scattered at sea.

References

External links 

1905 births
2000 deaths
American animated film directors
American people of Hungarian descent
Animators from California
Animators from New York (state)
Fleischer Studios people
Hanna-Barbera people
People from Sunnyvale, California
Screen Gems
Walter Lantz Productions people
Warner Bros. Cartoons directors